Apače may refer to places in Slovenia:

 Apače, town and seat of
 Municipality of Apače
 Apače, Kidričevo